The Ministry of Science and Technology (abbreviated MOST) administers Burma's science and technology research and development affairs. MOST was established on 2 October 1996 under Order No. 30/96. The ministry was dissolved in 2016 by President Htin Kyaw and formed again in 2021 by SAC Chairman Min Aung Hlaing.

Dissolved 
The Ministry of Science and Technology is organized under the Ministry of Education as Ministry of Education (Science and Technology) in April 2016 by the Government of Myanmar, led by Htin Kyaw. There are 57 Universities, Colleges and Technical Institutes under the MOE-ST.

On 17 June 2021, the State Administration Council reformed the Ministry of Education as the Ministry of Education and the Ministry of Science and Technology.

See also
 Cabinet of Myanmar
 List of Technological Universities in Myanmar

References

External links
 Official website

ScienceandTechnology
Myanmar
Ministries established in 1996
1996 establishments in Myanmar